The Case Against 8 is an American documentary film, which premiered at the 2014 Sundance Film Festival on January 18, 2014. Directed and produced by Ben Cotner and Ryan White, the film documents the legal battle to overturn California's Proposition 8, focusing in particular on behind-the-scenes footage of David Boies and Theodore Olson during the Perry v. Schwarzenegger case.

Cast

Release
Cotner and White won the Directing Award: U.S. Documentary at the Sundance Film Festival. The film was also subsequently screened at the 2014 SXSW festival, where it won an Audience Award.

The film screened at the 2014 Hot Docs Canadian International Documentary Festival in Toronto, Ontario and went on to screen within such festivals as SXSW and Maryland Film Festival. The film also received a limited theatrical release in June 2014, screening in New York City, Los Angeles and other major US cities before airing on HBO on June 23.

In Australia, it screened in conjunction with Queer Screen and Australian Marriage Equality on the 20th of August  Independent MP and Chair of AME Alex Greenwich introduced the film to the audience where he mentioned Australia's conservative government pollster Crosby Textor Group and the research that has polled the biggest support for same-sex marriage in Australia where 72% of Australians support legalising same-sex marriage.

References

External links

HBO documentary films site (US)

2014 films
American documentary films
American LGBT-related films
Documentary films about same-sex marriage in the United States
2014 LGBT-related films
2008 California Proposition 8
HBO documentary films
Films scored by Blake Neely
Documentary films about American politics
2014 documentary films
Sundance Film Festival award winners
Documentary films about California
2010s English-language films
2010s American films